Kaung Sithu (born 22 January 1993) is a burmese professional footballer who plays as a striker for the Myanmar national football team and Southern Myanmar F.C. He scored 3 goals in 2013 AFC U-22 Asian Cup qualification including a brace in qualification decider against Malaysia.

International

International goals
Scores and results list Myanmar's goal tally first.

References

1993 births
Living people
Sportspeople from Mandalay
Burmese footballers
Myanmar international footballers
Yangon United F.C. players
Yadanarbon F.C. players
Zwegabin United F.C. players
Zeyashwemye F.C. players
Association football forwards
Southern Myanmar F.C. players